The Cathedral of St Justus and St Pastor in Alcalá de Henares (Spanish: Catedral de los Santos Niños Justo y Pastor de Alcalá de Henares) is a Roman Catholic cathedral located in Alcalá de Henares, Spain. It was declared Bien de Interés Cultural in 1904.

The Carrillo archbishop (1446-1482), elevated the church to the rank of collegiate church. At the time of Cardinal Cisneros (1495-1517) he was awarded the title of "Master" and the current building was designed, constructed between 1497 and 1515 in late Gothic style typical of this stage. The tower was built between 1528 and 1582.

In 1904 the cathedral was declared a National Monument. During the Spanish Civil War (1936-1939) the church was burned losing virtually all its treasures, saving some bars and some chairs from the old choir. In 1991 the diocese of Alcalá restored and elevated to the status of cathedral-master, the Diocese Complutense recovering that which was from the 5th century until 1099.

Exterior

The exterior of the cathedral is simple and austere. The walls are covered by molding type Segovia. They emphasize the cover of the western facade of Flamboyant Gothic style, in which central medallion depicted on Saint Ildefonso; and the tower, designed by Rodrigo Gil de Hontañón and Rodrigo Argüello, in herrerian style, with a height of 62.05 meters. Top is a beautiful spire tower slate.

The cathedral has a severe seventeenth century cloister arches between pilasters. Soils appear covered by Renaissance carpets from nearby convents. In one of the walls the grave of Cardinal Cisneros remains.

Interior

The building's interior is divided into three naves covered by cross vaults resting on pillars fasciculados. The overall shape of the building resembles the traditional Latin cross with marked transept. The entire building suffered much in that fire, and countless works of art and objects of great historical, devotional and sentimental value were lost. Today the cathedral houses apart from its religious functions, an interpretive center and the Cathedral Museum.

References 

Bien de Interés Cultural landmarks in the Community of Madrid
Buildings and structures in Alcalá de Henares
Alcalá
Churches in the Community of Madrid
16th-century Roman Catholic church buildings in Spain